The 2020 AFF Championship (officially AFF Suzuki Cup 2020 for sponsorship reasons) was the 13th edition of the AFF Championship, the football championship of nations affiliated to the ASEAN Football Federation (AFF), the 7th and the last edition under the name AFF Suzuki Cup.

The final tournament was originally scheduled to run from 23 November to 31 December 2020. However the tournament was postponed and rescheduled at least twice due to the COVID-19 pandemic; the tournament was first rescheduled to run from 11 April to 8 May 2021 and the schedule later pushed backed further to 5 December 2021 to 1 January 2022. Singapore later was chosen for host this tournament in a centralized venue.

Vietnam were the defending champions, but were eliminated by Thailand in the semi-finals. Thailand won the tournament by a 6–2 victory in the two-legged final against Indonesia to secure their sixth title.

Format
The AFF Suzuki Cup 2020 was hosted in a centralized venue due to the ongoing COVID-19 pandemic in Southeast Asia. On 28 September 2021, it was announced that Singapore would host the tournament. Cambodia, Indonesia, Thailand and Vietnam also expressed interest in hosting the tournament.

In the group stage of the competition proper, ten teams were drawn in two groups of five with single round-robin format. The top two teams of each group advance to the semi-finals.

The organizers preferred to hold the tournament under its original format, which featured two-leg home-and-away games. Away goals rule wouldn't be applied.

Up to five substitutions may be allowed as per recommendation of FIFA.

Qualification

Nine teams automatically qualified to the AFF Championship final tournament; they were separated into their respective pots based on their performance of the last two editions. Brunei and Timor-Leste who were the two lowest-performing teams were supposed to play a match where the winner will secure a spot to the final tournament but Brunei withdrew citing the COVID-19 pandemic. Australia applied to attend the 2020 AFF Championship but was rejected by the AFF.

Due to non-compliance with conditions set by the World Anti-Doping Agency (WADA), Thailand and Indonesia were not allowed to be represented by their national flags.

Qualified teams

Notes

Draw
The draw for the 2020 AFF Championship was originally set to be held on 10 August 2021 in Singapore but due to the enhanced COVID-19 restrictions in the country, the draw was postponed. The draw was done virtually and held on 21 September 2021. The pot placements followed each teams progress in the previous two editions.

At the time of the draw, the identity of the national team that secured qualification was unknown, as it was supposed to be contested between Brunei and Timor Leste. Timor Leste qualified to the group stage after the withdrawal of Brunei from the qualification play-off.

Squads

Each team were allowed a preliminary squad of 50 players. A final squad of 30 players (three of whom must be goalkeepers) 23 players registered for each match.

Officials
The following officials were chosen for the competition.

Referees

 Ammar Ebrahim Mahfoodh
 Ahmed Faisal Al-Ali
 Ahmad Yaqoub Ibrahim
 Kim Dae-yong
 Kim Hee-gon
 Nazmi Nasaruddin
 Qasim Al-Hatmi
 Yaqoob Abdul Baki
 Saoud Ali Al-Adba
 Shukri Al-Hunfush
 Mohammed Al-Hoaish
 Ahmad A'Qashah

Assistant referees

 Salman Ebrahim
 Nurhadi Sulchan
 Ahmand Mansour Samara Muhsen
 Hamzah Adel Abu-Obaid
 Park Kyun-yong
 Kang Dong-ho
 Saif Talib Al-Ghafri
 Abu Bakar Al-Amri
 Zahy Snaid Al-Shammari
 Jasem Abdulla Yousef
 Faisal Nasser Al-Qahtani
 Rawut Nakarit

Venues

Group stage

Tiebreakers
Ranking in each group shall be determined as follows:
 Greater number of points obtained in all the group matches;
 Goal difference in all the group matches;
 Greater number of goals scored in all the group matches.
If two or more teams are equal on the basis on the above three criteria, the place shall be determined as follows:
 Result of the direct match between the teams concerned;
 Penalty shoot-out if only the teams are tied, and they met in the last round of the group;
 Drawing lots by the Organising Committee.

Group A

Group B

Knockout phase

Bracket

Semi-finals

First leg

Second leg

Indonesia won 5–3 on aggregate.

Thailand won 2–0 on aggregate.

Final

First leg

Second leg

Thailand won 6–2 on aggregate.

Statistics

Winner

Awards

Goalscorers

Discipline
In the final tournament, a player was suspended for the subsequent match in the competition for either getting red card or accumulating two yellow cards in two different matches.

In addition, 4 Indonesian players (Elkan Baggott, Victor Igbonefo, Rizky Ridho and Rizky Dwi Febrianto) were barred from the 2nd leg of the Indonesia-Thailand Final on 1 January 2022 for breaching COVID-19 safety measures by leaving the team hotel without authorisation.

Tournament teams ranking
This table will show the ranking of teams throughout the tournament.

Marketing

Matchballs
The official ball for AFF Suzuki Cup 2020 is the ASEAN PULSE, which is sponsored by Warrix.

Sponsorship

Media coverage

Notes

References

External links
 AFF Suzuki Cup Official website
 ASEAN Federation Official website

 
AFF Championship tournaments
AFF Championship
AFF Championship
AFF Championship
AFF Championship
AFF Championship
AFF Championship
AFF Championship
AFF Championship
AFF Championship
International association football competitions hosted by Singapore